The governor-general of Grenada is the vice-regal representative of the Grenadian monarch, currently King Charles III, in Grenada. The governor-general is appointed by the monarch on the recommendation of the prime minister of Grenada. The functions of the governor-general include appointing ministers, judges, and ambassadors; giving royal assent to legislation passed by the Grenadian Parliament; and issuing writs for election.

In general, the governor-general observes the conventions of the Westminster system and responsible government, maintaining a political neutrality, and has to always act only on the advice of the prime minister. The governor-general also has a ceremonial role: hosting events at the official residenceGovernment House in the capital, St. George's and bestowing honours to individuals and groups who are contributing to Grenada and to their communities. When travelling abroad, the governor-general is seen as the representative of Grenada and its monarch.

Governors-general formally serve "at the monarch's pleasure". Since 7 May 2013, the governor-general has been Dame Cécile La Grenade.

The office of the governor-general was created on 7 February 1974, when Grenada gained independence from the United Kingdom as a sovereign state and an independent constitutional monarchy. Since then, 6 individuals have served as governor-general.

Appointment

The governor-general is formally appointed by the monarch of Grenada. When a new governor-general is to be appointed, the current prime minister recommends a name to the monarch, who by convention accepts that recommendation. At the installation ceremony, the new governor-general takes an Oath of Allegiance and Office.

Functions

Grenada shares the person of the sovereign equally with 14 other countries in the Commonwealth of Nations. As the sovereign works and resides predominantly outside of Grenadian borders, the governor-general's primary task is to perform the monarch's constitutional duties on his or her behalf. As such, the governor-general carries out his or her functions in the government of Grenada on behalf and in the name of the Sovereign, but is not involved in the day-to day running of the government.

The governor-general's powers and roles are derive from the Grenadian constitution's Section 19 to 22, which set out certain provisions relating to the governor-general.

Constitutional role

The governor-general is responsible for summoning, proroguing, and dissolving parliament and issues writs for new elections. After an election, the governor-general formally requests the leader of the political party which gains the support of a majority in parliament to form a government. the governor-general commissions the prime minister and appoints other ministers after the election.

The governor-general, on the Sovereign's behalf, gives royal assent to laws passed by the Parliament of Grenada.

The governor-general also appoints state judges, ministers ambassadors and high commissioners to overseas countries, and other senior government officials.

The governor-general may, in certain circumstances, exercise without – or contrary to – ministerial advice. These are known as the reserve powers, and include:
appointing a prime minister if an election has resulted in a 'hung parliament'.
dismissing the prime minister who has lost the confidence of the parliament.
dismissing any minister acting unlawfully.
refusing to dissolve the House of Representatives despite a request from the prime minister.

Ceremonial role

The governor-general's ceremonial duties include opening new sessions of parliament by delivering the Speech from the Throne, welcoming visiting heads of state, and receiving the credentials of foreign diplomats.

The governor-general also presents honours at investitures to Grenadians for notable service to the community, or for acts of bravery.

Community role

The governor-general provides non-partisan leadership in the community, acting as patron of many charitable, service, sporting and cultural organisations, and attending functions throughout the country.

The governor-general also encourages, articulates and represents those things that unite Grenadians together. In this role, the governor-general:

attends charitable, social, and civic events across the country.
accepts patronage of many national, charitable, cultural, educational, sporting and professional organisations.
visits and gives speeches at non-governmental organisations.

Privileges

Through the passage of the National Honours and Awards Act in 2007, Grenada established two national orders: the Order of Grenada and the Prestige Order of the National Hero. The governor-general, serves as the Chancellor of all these orders.

Salary

The governor-general receives an annual salary of EC$ 148,539.

Symbols

The governor-general uses a personal flag, which features a lion passant atop a St. Edward's royal crown with "Grenada" written on a scroll underneath, all on a blue background. It is flown on buildings and other locations in Grenada to mark the governor-general's presence.

Residence

Government House in St. George's is the official residence of the governor-general of Grenada. Since Government House was destroyed by Hurricane Ivan in 2004 however, the Governor-General has resided in a residence in Point Salines, south of the capital.

List of governors-general
Following is a list of people who have served as governor-general of Grenada since independence in 1974.

See also
List of heads of government of Grenada

References

External links
Governor-General's website

Grenada, List of Governors-General of
 
Governors-General
1974 establishments in Grenada